Gert Herunter (born 9 March 1942) is an Austrian athlete. He competed in the men's decathlon at the 1968 Summer Olympics.

References

1942 births
Living people
Athletes (track and field) at the 1968 Summer Olympics
Austrian decathletes
Olympic athletes of Austria
People from Witzenhausen
Sportspeople from Kassel (region)